Juan de Orduña y Fernández-Shaw (27 December 1900 – 3 February 1974) was a Spanish film director, screenwriter and actor. Subservient to the ideological tenets and preferences of Francoism, he was one of the regime's standout directors during the autarchy period. He particularly earned recognition for his epic-historicist films, including the extravagant Madness for Love (1948), "an immense commercial success".

Filmography 
 Me has hecho perder el juicio (1973)
 Eusébio, la Pantera Negra (1973)
 El caserío (1972)
 El huésped del sevillano (1970)
 The Complete Idiot (1970)
 Bohemios (1969)
 La canción del olvido (1969)
 The Troublemaker (1969)
 Farewell to Marriage (1968)
 Maruxa (1968)
 Anónima de asesinos (1967)
 Abajo espera la muerte (1966)
 Aragonese Nobility (1965)
 Bochorno (1963)
 El amor de los amores (1962)
 Teresa de Jesús (1961)
 La tirana (1958)
 Música de ayer (1958)
 The Last Torch Song (1957)
 Father Cigarette (1955)
 Zalacaín el aventurero (1955)
 Cañas y barro (1954)
 Dawn of America (1951)
 The Lioness of Castille (1951)
 Agustina of Aragon (1950)
 Pequeñeces (1950)
 Tempestad en el alma (1949)
 Vendaval (1949)
 Mi enemigo el doctor (1948)
 Madness for Love (1948)
 Lola Leaves for the Ports (1947)
 Serenata española (1947)
 Un drama nuevo (1946)
 Leyenda de feria (1946)
 White Mission (1946)
 Ella, él y sus millones (1944)
 Life Begins at Midnight (1944)
 Yo no me caso (1944)
 Tuvo la culpa Adán (1944)
 Deliciosamente tontos (1943)
 Autumn Roses (1943)
 Nostalgia (1942)
 El frente de los suspiros (1942)
 Follow the Legion (1942)
 Porque te vi llorar (1941)
 Suite granadina (1940)
 Feria en Sevilla (1940)
 Una aventura de cine (1928)
 The Troublemaker (1924)

References

Further reading 

Juan-Navarro, Santiago. “De los orígenes del Estado español al Nuevo Estado: La construcción de la ideología franquista en Alba de América, de Juan de Orduña.” Anales de la Literatura Española Contemporánea 33.1 (2008): 79-104. 
Juan-Navarro, Santiago. “La Patria enajenada: Locura de Amor, de Juan de Orduña, como alegoría nacional.” Hispania 88.1 (2005): 204–15. 
Juan-Navarro, Santiago. “Political Madness: Juan de Orduña´s Locura de amor as a National Allegory.” Juana of Castile: History and Myth of the Mad Queen. Eds. María A. Gómez et al. Lewisburg and London: Bucknell University Press, 2008.

External links 
 

1900 births
1974 deaths
Spanish male film actors
Spanish male silent film actors
Spanish film directors
Male actors from Madrid